Katie McGlynn (born 16 July 1993) is an English actress. She is known for her roles as Jodie "Scout" Allen in Waterloo Road (2011–2013), Sinead Tinker in Coronation Street (2013–2020), and Becky Quentin in Hollyoaks (2021–2022). She also competed in the nineteenth series of Strictly Come Dancing before being eliminated in week 3.

Filmography

Awards and nominations

References

External links
 

1993 births
Living people
English soap opera actresses
English television actresses
21st-century English actresses
Actresses from Greater Manchester
actors from Rochdale